The 1950 Xavier Musketeers football team was an American football team that represented Xavier University as an independent during the 1950 college football season. In its fourth season under head coach Ed Kluska, the team compiled an 8–1 record and outscored opponents by a total of 247 to 141. The team played its home games at Xavier Stadium in Cincinnati.

Among other games, Xavier defeated the otherwise unbeaten 1950 Miami Redskins football team that was coached by Woody Hayes and Ara Parseghian and that featured John Pont at halfback and Bo Schembechler at tackle.

Schedule

References

Xavier
Xavier Musketeers football seasons
Xavier Musketeers football